At the 2005 East Asian Games, the athletics events were held at the Estádio Campo Desportivo in Macau, People's Republic of China from 1–4 November. A total of 45 events were contested, of which 23 by male and 22 by female athletes. China easily topped the medal table, winning 26 of the 45 available gold medals and accounting for half of the total female medallists. Japan won 46 medals, 16 of them gold, while South Korea was a clear third with a total of 21 medals. No athletes from either Guam or Mongolia reached the podium.

During the four-day competition, a total of 11 East Asian Games records were broken. Among these were Liu Xiang's 13.21 seconds run in the 110 metres hurdles and a 20.06 m throw in the shot put from Zhang Qi (who had set a Chinese record some weeks earlier). The 2000 Olympic Champion Wang Liping brought her career to a close with a final gold in the 20 km race walk.

A total of six athletes medalled in multiple individual events: Yuki Nakamura won both the men's 5000 and 10,000 metres events, while Hiromi Ominami won two silvers on the women's side. Lee Duhaeng took 10,000 m silver and 5000 m bronze, Bae Hae-Jin did a bronze double in the 1500/5000 m, and Chen Fu-Pin won the 800 metres silver and 1500 m bronze. In the field events, Yuka Murofushi won bronze in both the discus and hammer throws.

While the large majority of events featured performances of an international standard, some competitions fell far short of the level expected of a regional games event. Many of Japan's top athletes were absent and a number of Chinese competitors had peaked earlier at the 10th Chinese National Games in Nanjing. Only one athlete (Takuro Mori) managed to clear the bar in the whole of the men's pole vault contest, while Hou Fei took bronze in the men's hammer with a small throw of 37.14 (almost half that of the winner). In the women's 4×400 metres relay Macau's bronze medal time of 4:05.61 was over thirty seconds slower than the winning team, and some 50 seconds off the world record time. Furthermore, the distances races were criticised for their slow pacing, the men's 10,000 bronze medalist running slightly slower than the women's bronze medalist.

Records

Medal summary

Men

Women

Medal table

References
General
East Asian Games. GBR Athletics. Retrieved on 2010-02-21.
Chua, Chong Jin (2005-10-30). Chinese set to dominate – East Asian Games, PREVIEW. IAAF. Retrieved on 2010-02-21.
Chua, Chong Jin (2005-11-01). China Reigns! East Asian Games, Day One. IAAF. Retrieved on 2010-02-21.
Chua, Chong Jin (2005-11-02). Liu Xiang takes expected win, as action hots-up in Macau - East Asian Games, Day Two. IAAF. Retrieved on 2010-02-21.
Chua, Chong Jin (2005-11-03). Japan fights back – East Asian Games, Day Three. IAAF. Retrieved on 2010-02-21.
Chua, Chong Jin (2005-11-04). China Tops Medal Tally - East Asian Games, Day Four Report. IAAF. Retrieved on 2010-02-21.
Specific

External links
Official website archived via Wayback Machine

2005 East Asian Games
Athletics at the East Asian Games
East Asian Games